Funnel analysis involves mapping and analyzing a series of events that lead towards a defined goal, like an advertisement-to-purchase journey in online advertising, or the flow that starts with user engagement in a mobile app and ends in a sale on an eCommerce platform. Funnel analyses "are an effective way to calculate conversion rates on specific user behaviors".
This can be in the form of a sale, registration, or other intended action from an audience. 

The term 'funnel analysis' comes from the analogy with a physical kitchen or garage funnel, which gets narrower along its length, allowing less volume to pass through it. Similarly, an analytics funnel helps visualize how a large number of individuals enter the funnel, yet only a small proportion of them will perform the intended actions and reach the end goal on a website, eCommerce platform, application, or online game.

Real world applications
An example of how a company would use funnel analytics is by focusing on drawing actionable insights from funnels. Funnel analysis can be used to determine conversion and user fallout rates in a given funnel. An analysis to determine the steps that lead to a desired goal in order to improve future interactions in the same funnel can be done for further success. To illustrate further, looking at how many users actually make it to the end of the funnel, for example to make a purchase or register, compared with how many do not.

By continuously monitoring and analyzing funnels, it is possible to assess if changes to an application or platform are having a positive effect on conversion. For instance, one might find that only 10% of users who come to a platform and enter the registration funnel actually reach the goal of completing registration. Using the funnel analytics process, it is then possible to tweak settings or features within the funnel in order to see what makes that number improve. Or when creating a marketing campaign, there is a chance to analyze how well the campaign is working by monitoring a funnel that brings users from the initial event all the way to purchasing a product.

Funnel analysis helps determine the point in which users are dropping off. The next step is to understand why they're dropping off, in order to reduce drop off rates and in turn increase overall conversion.

However, it's worth noting that the funnel as a linear approach is getting less relevant in today’s marketing. Consumers nowadays are having a more dynamic journey. Instead of just narrowing their options, they widen the resources to help them make a decision. And when they finally make a purchase, consumers share their opinion of the brand, regardless if it’s good or bad. They also set a standard based on their best brand experience and this affects their brand relationships and overall journey.

See also 
Big data
Behavioral analytics
Analytics
Mobile app

References

External links 
 A Beginners Guide To Sales Funnel

Business intelligence terms